Alcoriza is a surname. Notable people with the surname include:

David Alcoriza (born 1968), American sport shooter
Francisco Alcoriza (1903–1991), Spanish footballer
Janet Alcoriza (1918–1998), Austrian-born Mexican screenwriter and actress
Luis Alcoriza (1918–1992), Mexican screenwriter, film director and actor